Matar Fall, also known as Martin Fall (born March 18, 1982 in Toulon, France) is a French-born Senegalese professional football player currently playing in French league CFA 2 for Sporting Toulon Var.

His real name is Matar, but it was distorted by journalists and fans as Martin for so long that he is known as "man with two first names".

References

External links
 

1982 births
Living people
Citizens of Senegal through descent
Senegalese footballers
French footballers
Senegal international footballers
Ligue 2 players
Championnat National players
SC Toulon players
Angers SCO players
ÉFC Fréjus Saint-Raphaël players
Gazélec Ajaccio players
French sportspeople of Senegalese descent
Association football midfielders